Amblymora (=Australothelais) is a genus of longhorn beetles of the subfamily Lamiinae, containing the following species:

 Amblymora australica Breuning, 1948 [Subgenus Australamblymora]
 Amblymora baloghi Breuning, 1975
 Amblymora bivittata Breuning, 1939
 Amblymora carinipennis Breuning, 1974
 Amblymora conferta Pascoe, 1867
 Amblymora consputa Pascoe, 1867
 Amblymora demarzi (Breuning, 1963)
 Amblymora densepunctata (Breuning, 1963)
 Amblymora elongata Breuning, 1943
 Amblymora excavata Breuning, 1939
 Amblymora fergussoni Breuning, 1970
 Amblymora fumosa Pascoe, 1867
 Amblymora gebeensis Breuning, 1958
 Amblymora instabilis Pascoe, 1867
 Amblymora keyana Breuning, 1965
 Amblymora marmorata Breuning, 1939
 Amblymora multiguttata Breuning, 1948 [Subgenus Diallamblymora]
 Amblymora obiensis Breuning, 1956
 Amblymora papuana Breuning, 1939
 Amblymora pseudoconferta Breuning, 1939
 Amblymora rufula Breuning, 1950
 Amblymora samarensis Breuning, 1947
 Amblymora spinipennis Breuning, 1939
 Amblymora strandiella Breuning, 1943
 Amblymora uniformis Jordan, 1894
 Amblymora v-flava Gilmour, 1950

References

 
Desmiphorini
Cerambycidae genera